Goldfish are small freshwater fish that are commonly kept in aquariums and ponds.

Goldfish may also refer to:

 Goldfish (band), an electronica and dance group from Cape Town, South Africa
 Goldfish (comics), or A.K.A. Goldfish, a 1994 American comic book series written and drawn by Brian Michael Bendis
 Goldfish (cracker), a type of snack crackers manufactured by Pepperidge Farm
 The Goldfish, a 1924 American silent film directed by Jerome Storm
 Goldfish (Matisse), a 1912 painting
 Goldfish plant, two genera of flowering plants, Columnea and Nematanthus
 "Goldfish" (The Brak Show), a 2001 episode

See also 
 List of goldfish varieties
 The Golden Fish (disambiguation)